Sharon Tyndale (January 19, 1816 – April 29, 1871) was the Secretary of State of Illinois, United States, from 1865 to 1869. His tenure is notable for his redesign of the Great Seal of the State of Illinois.

Background
Born in Philadelphia, Pennsylvania, Tyndale moved to Belleville, Illinois in 1833 and worked in the mercantile business. He moved back to Philadelphia and worked in the mercantile business with his father. In 1845, he moved to Peoria, Illinois and studied to be a civil engineer. In 1857, Tyndale was elected County Surveyor of St. Clair County, Illinois. President Abraham Lincoln appointed Tyndale postmaster of Belleville, Illinois in 1861. From 1865 to 1869, Tyndale served as Illinois Secretary of State, as a Republican. After Tyndale left office, he stayed in Springfield, Illinois and worked for Gilman, Clinton and Springfield Railroad doing a survey. His brother was Hector Tyndale, a United States Army officer.

Seal of the State of Illinois
In 1867, Tyndale himself requested that the Illinois General Assembly authorize a redesign of the seal, with one key suggestion, that the words of the motto (State Sovereignty, National Union) be reversed (to National Union, State Sovereignty). The legislature did authorize the redesign but specifically required the redesign to maintain the motto's word order. Then they gave Tyndale responsibility for the redesign. Tyndale overhauled the Great Seal, but he did so in a manner that appeared to thwart the legislature's intent. His new seal featured a twisted banner, which caused the word "sovereignty" to be upside down, albeit, in the order required by the legislature. Tyndale's banner has remained in place, with only minor changes, since 1868.

Assassination
Two years after leaving office, Tyndale was assassinated outside his home, in Springfield, Illinois, on April 29, 1871. His killer was never identified.

See also
List of unsolved murders

Notes

1816 births
1871 deaths
1871 murders in the United States
19th-century American politicians
American surveyors
Businesspeople from Illinois
Businesspeople from Philadelphia
County officials in Illinois
Illinois Republicans
People from Belleville, Illinois
People murdered in Illinois
Politicians from Philadelphia
Politicians from Springfield, Illinois
Secretaries of State of Illinois
Unsolved murders in the United States
19th-century American businesspeople
Illinois postmasters